Majestic Cinema may refer to:
 Majestic Cinema, Bridgnorth, Shropshire, England
 Majestic Cinema, King's Lynn, Norfolk, England
 Majestic Cinema, Leeds, Yorkshire, England